The Moyes Max is an Australian high-wing, single-place, hang glider that was designed and produced by Moyes Delta Gliders of Botany, New South Wales in the mid-2000s. Now out of production, when it was available the aircraft was supplied complete and ready-to-fly.

Design and development
The Max was developed as an intermediate-level hang glider, incorporating a variable geometry system.

The Max is made from aluminum tubing, with the 70% double-surface wing covered in Dacron sailcloth. Available in only one size, the Max 157, its  span wing is cable braced from a single kingpost.

Specifications (Max 157)

References

External links

Max
Hang gliders